This was the twenty-first season of rugby league's League Cup competition, known as the Regal Trophy for sponsorship purposes.

Widnes won the final, beating Leeds by the score of 24–0. The match was played at Central Park, Wigan. The attendance was 15,070.

Background 
This season saw two "name" changes and one of the three junior clubs being replaced by a new league club. The number of entrants remained the  same at thirty-eight.
The  changes were :-
1 Runcorn Highfield became Highfield and now played at Hoghton Road Stadium in Sutton, a suburb of St. Helens and home to  St Helens Town A.F.C. (although signing a 99-year lease, the club moved on after 4½ years after a proposed rent increase made a stay unviable - Fulham became London Crusaders but were still nomadic, although playing many home matches at Crystal Palace National Sports Centre before settling at Barnet Copthall for season 1993-94
2 Scarborough Pirates joined the  league and the  competition (albeit for a very brief one season stay before going into administration), taking the place of one of the  junior teams-
The preliminary round involved twelve clubs, to reduce the numbers to entrants to the  first round proper to thirty-two.

Competition and results

Preliminary round 
Involved  2 matches and 4 Clubs

Round 1 - First  Round 
Involved  16 matches and 32 Clubs

Round 1 - First  Round Replays 
Involved 1 match and 2 Clubs

Round 2 - Second  Round 
Involved  8 matches and 16 Clubs

Round 3 -Quarter Finals 
Involved 4 matches with 8 clubs

Round 4 – Semi-Finals 
Involved 2 matches and 4 Clubs

Final

Teams

Prize money 
As part of the sponsorship deal and funds, the prize money awarded to the competing teams for this season is as follows:

The road to success 
This tree excludes any preliminary round fixtures

Notes and comments 
1 * Saddleworth Rangers are a Junior (amateur) club from Oldham
2 * Watersheddings was the home ground of Oldham
3 * Leigh East are a Junior (amateur) club from Leigh
4 * Hilton Park was the home ground of Leigh
5 * RUGBYLEAGUEproject gives the attendance as 1,874 but Widnes official archives gives it as 2,000
6 * Valley Parade was originally the home of Manningham Rugby League Football Club until 1903, when they changed name and codes and became Bradford City A.F.C.
7 * RUGBYLEAGUEproject gives the attendance as 15,070 but Widnes official archives gives it as 15,023
8  * Central Park was the home ground of Wigan with a final capacity of 18,000, although the record attendance was  47,747 for Wigan v St Helens 27 March 1959

General information for those unfamiliar 
The council of the Rugby Football League voted to introduce a new competition, to be similar to The Football Association and Scottish Football Association's "League Cup". It was to be a similar knock-out structure to, and to be secondary to, the Challenge Cup. As this was being formulated, sports sponsorship was becoming more prevalent and as a result John Player and Sons, a division of Imperial Tobacco Company, became sponsors, and the competition never became widely known as the "League Cup" 
The competition ran from 1971-72 until 1995-96 and was initially intended for the professional clubs plus the two amateur BARLA National Cup finalists. In later seasons the entries were expanded to take in other amateur and French teams. The competition was dropped due to "fixture congestion" when Rugby League became a summer sport
The Rugby League season always (until the onset of "Summer Rugby" in 1996) ran from around August-time through to around May-time and this competition always took place early in the season, in the Autumn, with the final usually taking place in late January 
The competition was variably known, by its sponsorship name, as the Player's No.6 Trophy (1971–1977), the John Player Trophy (1977–1983), the John Player Special Trophy (1983–1989), and the Regal Trophy in 1989.

See also 
1991-92 Rugby Football League season
1991 Lancashire Cup
1991 Yorkshire Cup
Regal Trophy
Rugby league county cups

References

External links
Saints Heritage Society
1896–97 Northern Rugby Football Union season at wigan.rlfans.com 
Hull&Proud Fixtures & Results 1896/1897
Widnes Vikings - One team, one passion Season In Review - 1896-97
The Northern Union at warringtonwolves.org
Huddersfield R L Heritage
Wakefield until I die

1991 in English rugby league
1992 in English rugby league
League Cup (rugby league)